Mazin is a village in Croatia. 

Mazin or Mazina may also refer to:
Mazin (given name)
Mazin (surname)
MazinSaga, a Japanese manga
Mazin Saga: Mutant Fighter, a video game
Lecithocera mazina, a moth